Vittorio Mancini (born 24 July 1936) is a Sammarinese wrestler. He competed in the men's freestyle bantamweight at the 1960 Summer Olympics.

References

External links
 

1936 births
Living people
Sammarinese male sport wrestlers
Olympic wrestlers of San Marino
Wrestlers at the 1960 Summer Olympics